Rudolf Lenz (25 May 1920 – 12 July 1987) was an Austrian actor.

Selected filmography
  The Forester of the Silver Wood (1954)
 Victoria in Dover (1954)
 The Dairymaid of St. Kathrein (1955)
 Forest Liesel (1956)
 The Hunter of Fall (1956)
 The Poacher of the Silver Wood (1957)
 The Priest and the Girl (1958)
 World on a Wire (1973)
 Fox and His Friends (1975)
 The Roaring Fifties (1983)

References

External links
 

1920 births
1987 deaths
Austrian male film actors
Austrian male television actors
Actors from Graz
20th-century Austrian male actors